Coundon is an old mining village in County Durham, England. The Boldon Book mentions a mine in Coundon in the twelfth century. In 2001 it had a population of 2611. In 2011 the ward had a population of 7139.

History
The name Coundon comes from its original name, "Cunadun", which either translates in Old English "cow's hill", or else derives from the Brittonic toponymic term *cönẹ:d , whose meaning is obscure.

Sport
Coundon had a football team called Coundon TT which played in the FA Cup in 1984. However, the club folded in 1991. Coundon Greyhound Stadium was a greyhound racing stadium situated off the B6287 and was constructed in 1936, on fields to the south side of the Bishop's Park Colliery. It has since been demolished.

References

External links

 
Villages in County Durham